is a mecha anime series aired in Japan from 1982 to 1983. It is also referred to as Dairugger 15, Dairugger XV, Armored Armada Dairugger XV, Armored Squadron Dairugger XV,  or Machine Platoon Dairugger. It ran for 56 episodes (52 regular episodes and four recap episodes).

In the United States, it was heavily edited to become part of the Voltron series. The Dairugger footage was the primary source for the "Vehicle Voltron" episodes, though various footage was also inserted into the more commonly known "Lion Voltron" episodes (themselves adapted from another, unrelated Japanese series, Beast King GoLion).

Story
The Rugger Team is an exploration, planetary survey, and defensive force. Planet Earth is in a time of prosperity. The Galaxy Garrison launches a mission to explore the galaxy, colonize, and build new maps of the stars. Soon after commencing the mission, the Rugger Team and their starship, the Rugger Guard, are attacked by the xenophobic Galveston Empire. The Galveston homeworld is dying and their space fleet are also on a mission of exploration and colonization. Dairugger, the super robot, must defend the Rugger Guard and its fleet as they attempt to continue their mission. When Galveston repeatedly refuses to accept peaceful coexistence, the Rugger Guard mission turns to finding the Galveston homeworld, liberating its people from their despotic Emperor, and helping them find a new planet before their world collapses.

Characters

Dairugger pilots
The Rugger Team is made of three smaller teams of five members each: "Aki Team" (Air), "Keets Team" (Sea), and "Walter Team" (Land), after each team's leader. Each of the 15 parts is referred to as a "Rugger" and can combine into larger machines as separate teams called Kurugger (Air), Kairugger (Sea), and Rickrugger (Land), as well as together to form the super-robot Dairugger. The 15 separate Rugger units as well as the name come from the sport of rugby, since 15 players are required to form a rugby union team.

Aki Team
 is the air division of the Dairugger team.

Leader of the Aki Team and main pilot of Dairugger XV. Aki pilots Rugger #1, which forms Dairugger's head.

Pilot of Rugger #2, which forms Dairugger's upper torso.

Pilot of Rugger #3, which forms Dairugger's right shoulder and bicep. Shota is from the planet .

Pilot of Rugger #4, which forms Dairugger's left shoulder and bicep. Mutsu is the youngest member of the Dairugger team.

Female pilot of Rugger #5, which forms Daiugger's chest.

Keets Team
 is the sea division of the Dairugger team.

Leader of the Keets Team and pilot of Rugger #6, which forms Dairugger's mid-torso. A native of the planet , Keets is gifted with precognitive abilities that warn him of incoming threats.

Female pilot of Rugger #7, which forms Dairugger's right thigh. She is close friends with Aki and Mutsu.

Pilot of Rugger #8, which forms Dairugger's left thigh. Like Shota, Saruta is from the planet Sala.

Pilot of Rugger #9, which forms Dairugger's right shin.

Pilot of Rugger #10, which forms Dairugger's left shin.

Walter Team
 is the land division of the Dairugger team.

Leader of the Walter Team and pilot of Rugger #11, which forms Dairugger's waist.

Female pilot of Rugger #12, which forms Dairugger's right forearm. Like Keets, Moya is from the planet Mira.

Pilot of Rugger #13, which forms Dairugger's left forearm.

Pilot of Rugger #14, which forms Dairugger's right foot.

Pilot of Rugger #15, which forms Dairugger's left foot.

Galaxy Garrison
 is a planetary union of Earth, Sala, and Mira.

He is the first member of Galaxy Garrison to establish diplomatic negotiations with the Galveston Empire through Captain Drake. By episode 17, Ise becomes the captain of the Rugger Guard after Dick Asimov is reassigned to Earth.

Captain of the Rugger Guard. In episode 17, Asimov is reassigned to become Supreme Commander Dewa's aide-de-camp on Earth. In episode 33, he is commissioned as the commander of the Three Allied Planets fleet to attack planet Galveston. In episode 43, Asimov holds peace talks with Teles on the Number 3 Planet of the Number 37 Star System and offers to give the Galveston Empire full ownership of the planet on the conditions that the empire cease their aspirations of global conquest, that they leave the planet's indigenous human population in peace, and that they disarm their military. The negotiation falls through due to Supreme Commander Caponero's insistence of driving out the indigenous population. Teles leaves the planet, but Asimov has a small fleet stay to protect the inhabitants from an attack by Galveston. Asimov leads the Alliance to successfully invade planet Galveston. After the fall of the Galveston Empire in episode 52, Asimov informs Socrat Tes that the surviving citizens will be migrated to the Number 3 Planet.

Commander of the Galaxy Garrison's space fortress. In episode 22, Dewa sends a fleet led by Commander Date to rendezvous with the Rugger Guard on Planet K and prepare for an all-out war with the Galveston Empire.

The Rugger Guards doctor and head of the Research Department.

Dewa's second-in-command. Date leads a fleet as part of the Galaxy Garrison's war with the Galveston Empire. In episode 32, he and his crew sacrifice themselves by ramming their ship towards the Galveston Frontline Command's hangar doors to help the Dairugger team escape from the base's destruction.

Director of Galaxy Garrison.

A Galaxy Garrison officer under Commander Date. In episode 31, Yamamoto offers to command a ship on a suicide mission through the mine-laden asteroid belt to clear a path towards the Galveston Frontline Command.

 and 

Two Galaxy Garrison officers stationed at the Number 3 Planet of the Number 37 Star System in episode 45. When Morikawa is wounded during Commander Zukka's invasion, Aki fends off the invaders while Morikawa and Satou run to safety. They are both killed by Galveston forces after finding a cave for shelter.

Galveston Empire
The  is an advanced alien civilization in search for planets to colonize, as their home planet is rapidly dying from depletion of its natural resources and the deterioration of its Van Allen radiation belt. The Galveston Empire is named after Galveston Island, a barrier island in Texas with a history of piracy.

Commander of the Galveston Empire's Frontline Command. While the Galveston Empire starts the war with the Rugger Guard, Teles believes that both factions should explore the galaxy together. In episode 22, he is relieved of his duty by Commander Luciano and sent back to planet Galveston to become Garrison Commander. Upon his return to the planet, Teles is reassigned as Frontline Exploration Base Commander. Shortly after the destruction of Frontline Command, he is given new orders to attack and destroy the Earth fleet. Teles defies these orders and pursues a ceasefire with Galaxy Garrison. In episode 43, he meets with Captain Asimov to negotiate peace talks over the Number 3 Planet of the Number 37 Star System. The negotiations, however, fall through, due to the Supreme Command's insistence of taking the planet by force. He is then dismissed and placed on house arrest upon returning to Galveston. With the aid of Sirk, Teles is freed from captivity to lead the resistance forces against the government. In episode 51, the resistance succeeds after Emperor Corsair is killed during the uprising. While leading his people to evacuate the dying planet in episode 52, Teles is assassinated by three soldiers who blame him and the government for the planet's destruction. Teles is named after Teles of Megara, a Cynic philosopher from Ancient Greece.

A female member of the Galveston Royal Guard who is assigned as Teles' adjutant upon his return to the planet Galveston. Following Teles' house arrest on episode 47, Sirk is abducted by a guerrilla faction, who asks her to join their quest to overthrow Emperor Corsair. She collaborates with the guerrilla faction to free Teles from his house arrest. Following Teles' death at the hands of three assassins in episode 52, the Dairugger team urges Sirk to carry on his will to rebuild Galveston.

General commander of the Galveston Empire. Ignoring the deteriorating state of his planet, Caponello oversees the attacks on Galaxy Garrison to ensure Galveston's dominance in the galaxy. Once the Three Planets Alliance invades the planet, Caponello retreats to the palace and urges Emperor Corsair to migrate to another planet, but Corsair refuses the offer. Caponello, Gomez, and Ventura pilot a Battle Attacker in an attempt to escape from the Alliance, but are intercepted and destroyed by Dairugger. Caponello is named after the American gangster Al Capone.

Teles' father and Internal Secretary of the Galveston Empire. The Galveston supreme command holds Tes responsible for the ongoing riots in the country and dismisses him of his position upon Teles' return. In episode 34, upon his reinstatement in the government, he urges Teles to follow Emperor Corsair's orders to destroy the Earth fleet. By episode 51, Tes sides with his son and the resistance forces against the government. Once the empire falls, Tes offers to meet with Captain Asimov to negotiate the safe migration of his people to a new planet. Socrat Tes is named after the Greek philosopher Socrates.

Emperor of the Galveston Empire. When planet Galveston's defenses fall to the Three Planets Alliance in episode 51, Corsair refuses to leave the planet despite Caponello's pleas to do so and the resistance close to overthrowing the government. Corsair meets his fate by a stray shot from one of his fallen commanders.

Science secretary of the Galveston Empire. He is killed alongside Caponello and Ventura by Dairugger in episode 51.

A Galveston commander sent as reinforcement to Teles' fleet in episode 34. Rocher and his crew are immediately at odds with Teles' pacifistic approach to the Galaxy Garrison. In episode 36, Teles has Rocher negotiate a ceasefire with the Rugger Guard, but Rocher uses the negotiation to ambush the fleet. His plans, however, are thwarted by Dairugger. In episode 44, Rocher becomes Frontline Exploration Base Commander after Teles is dismissed for attempting to make peaceful negotiations with Galaxy Garrison. During the fall of the Exploration Base in episode 46, Rocher commandeers a Battle Attacker in a last-ditch effort to wipe out the Three Planets Alliance fleet, but is ultimately killed by Dairugger.

Second-in-command of the Galveston Empire's Frontline Command. In episode 22, Luciano replaces Teles as Frontline Commander with the intent of wiping out Earth from the galaxy. He is killed after the Aki and Keets teams detonate bombs in the Frontline Command's power source. Luciano is named after Italian-American mobster Lucky Luciano.

Rocher's subordinates. In episode 42, Jackson's fleet lands on the Number 3 Planet of the Number 37 Star System in response to Gallo evacuating the planet upon the Earth fleet's arrival. He defies Teles' orders and proceeds to advance towards the Earth fleet before Nolan arrives and stops him in time for peace talks. In episode 43, when the negotiation falls through and Teles has his fleets leave the planet, Rocher has Jackson return and attack the Earth fleet protecting the planet. Jackson's fleet is wiped out by the Earth forces.

A Galveston commander who attacks the Rugger Guard during a planetary exploration in episodes 1-3. He is killed when the planet explodes from the Frontline Command's photon missile bombardment. The Rugger Guard crew posthumously names the planet .

A Galveston infantry pilot. In episode 11, he is involved in a mid-air collision during training and crash lands near the vicinity of the Rugger Guard. Ise does not take Sim as a prisoner of war, but welcomes him as a guest of the ship. Izumo initially shows hostility towards Sim, but they shortly become friends. Once the Rugger Guard crew repairs Sim's ship, he bids them farewell and heads back to the Galveston fleet, only to be shot down and killed by Lafitte. In episode 52, Sim's younger brother is one of the three soldiers who assassinates Teles.

A Galveston captain loyal to Teles. In episode 15, Drake establishes diplomatic communication with Ise. When Teles is relieved of his duty as Frontline Commander, Drake is torn between following the Galveston Higher Command's orders and fulfilling Teles' wish of coexistence between Earth and Galveston. In episode 23, Drake's fleet attacks Commander Date' fleet, but he is killed after his entire fleet is wiped out in the battle. Drake is named after Francis Drake, an English privateer who carried out the second circumnavigation of Earth in a single expedition.

Drake's second-in-command. He is killed alongside Drake in episode 22 while battling Date's fleet. Roche is named after Roche Braziliano, a Dutch pirate who operated in Brazil and Jamaica during the mid-17th century.

A Galveston captain who only believes in the superiority of his race. In episode 16, Lafitte participates in the mutiny led by Captain Barataria, but he surrenders after Barataria takes his own life. Despite Lafitte's treason, Teles is ordered by the Supreme Command to release him and reinstate him as the commander of the Galveston Expeditionary Fleet. Lafitte abuses his position by interfering with other captains' involvement with the Rugger Guard and destroying the Galaxy Garrison's base on Planet K. In episode 22, his fleet conquers Planet K after forcing the Rugger Guard to retreat in a lengthy space naval battle. The Rugger Team launches a counterattack in episode 23, forcing Lafitte to withdraw from the planet. In episode 27, Lafitte's fleet attacks the Galaxy Garrison's Space Fortress, but is killed when the Space Fortress launches a fierce counterattack after destroying the fleet's Battle Machine. Lafitte is named after Jean Lafitte, a French pirate who operated in the Gulf of Mexico during the early 19th century.

A Galveston captain who disagrees with Teles' handling of the conflict with the Rugger Guard. In episode 16, Barataria and Lafitte stage a mutiny against Teles, which ends in failure. Rather than surrender to Teles, Barataria shoots himself in the head while Lafitte and the surviving mutineers are arrested. Barataria is named after Barataria Bay, a bay in Louisiana known for being Jean Lafitte's base during the early 19th century.

A Galveston captain loyal to Teles. In episode 18, Marius leads his fleet in a joint planetary expedition with the Rugger Guard, but he is forced by Lafitte to break the alliance and destroy the planet's forestry to make room for a Galveston base. Marius is named after Simon Marius, the German astronomer who discovered the four major moons of Jupiter before Galileo Galilei.

A Galveston commander who lures the Rugger Guard into a trap on a planet with inadequate oxygen in episode 26. His plan backfires when the affected Walter Team members regain consciousness and Dairugger is formed to fight his fleet's Battle Machine. When his fleet is wiped out, he attempts a Kamikaze run on the Rugger Guard, but his flagship is destroyed by Dairugger.

A Galveston commander who holds the male population of the planet Eldora captive in his underground base in episode 28. When Dairugger appears on the planet, the Eldorans stage an uprising and kill Sheela.

A Galveston commander who leads the Earth invasion fleet. In episode 30, he successfully penetrates Earth's defenses and bombards Galaxy Garrison's capital city, despite his fleet sustaining heavy losses. Upon his retreat to the Frontline Command, Ducas defies Luciano's orders and decides to attack the Earth fleet from behind, only to be killed by Dairugger. Ducas is named after Doukas, the family of noble Byzantine Greeks who ruled the Byzantine Empire in the 9th–11th centuries.

A Galveston commander of the expeditionary fleet at Sector NS71. In episode 33, Blanc's fleet attacks the Rugger Guard on a planet within the sector, but is wiped out by the incoming Three Planets Alliance fleet.

Rocher's female subordinate. In episode 38, after failing to destroy Dairugger on Planet J, Emma is ordered by Rocher to intercept the Rugger Guard on Planet 58 at all costs. Her plan to lure the Dairugger team through a narrow valley goes wrong when she is injured by a swarm of the planet's birds and captured by Aki Team. Emma promptly escapes from the Rugger Guard and returns to her fleet. Despite her injuries, she defies Teles' orders to retreat and proceeds to attack the Earth fleet, only to see her fleet wiped out before she is killed in a failed kamikaze run on the Rugger Guard.

Emma's adjutant. In episode 38, Sams is briefly forced to command Emma's fleet after she is injured during a scouting run on Planet 58 and captured by Aki Team. He is killed alongside Emma during a naval battle with the Rugger Guard.

A Galveston military officer stationed at the Number 21 Star System supply base. In episode 39, after the Rugger Guard attacks and captures the base, Antonov is held prisoner along with his comrades, but he offers to play a game of rugby with the Earth officers until Danton's fleet arrives to retake the base. During the battle, Antonov is torn between peace with the Earth forces and his loyalty to the empire until he sees Danton's forces indiscriminately massacring his comrades. While trying to retrieve the rugby ball, he is killed by Danton's Battle Attacker during its fight with Dairugger.

A Galveston captain who is ordered by Teles to set course for the unexplored sector near the Number 21 Star System supply base, but decides to take Rocher's orders to recapture the base from the Earth fleet. During the assault, Danton is killed by Dairugger while his fleet is wiped out by the Rugger Guard.

A Galveston commander whose exploration fleet discovers a habitable planet in the form of the Number 3 Planet of the Number 37 Star System in episode 41. He orders his fleet to leave the planet upon the presence of the Dairugger team. Despite his fleet's efforts to destroy their research information, the Dairugger team acquires vital exploration data from the abandoned base.

A Galveston commander sent by Teles to the Number 3 Planet to open peace talks with the Earth fleet in episodes 42-43. He arrives and stops Jackson from attacking the Rugger Guard before discussing with Ise on a meeting between Asimov and Teles.

A Galveston commander sent by Caponello to dismiss Teles as the Frontline Exploration Base Commander and hand the position to Rocher.

A Galveston commander who leads an assault on the Number 3 Planet on episode 45. After destroying Galaxy Garrison's base, Zukka is killed by Dairugger.

A Galveston commander stationed on the Number 11 Planet of the Galveston System. In episode 46, Caponello instructs Garrey to wipe out the invading Three Planets Alliance fleet with the Space Impulse, a series of missiles with anti-radar coating. The Alliance manages to destroy the stealth missiles by using their searchlights to spot them.

A Galveston commander assigned by Caponello to man the final line of defense against the approaching Three Planets Alliance fleet in episode 49. Holtes turns down Caponello's offer to send him two Battle Attackers, as he feels offended that his defensive fleet is thought to be unreliable. The fleet, however, is low on resources and poorly equipped. Holtes' fleet is wiped out during the battle and he goes down with his base from Dairugger's Miracle Beam.

Others

Queen of the planet  in episode 27. The female Eldorans are extremely distrustful of outsiders and initially mistake the Dairugger Team as members of the Galveston Empire, which have taken the planet's male population hostage. Aki attempts to open diplomatic relations with Zuno, hoping to form an alliance with the Eldorans. Commander Dorn, however, tricks Zuno into thinking the Dairugger Team is one of theirs, resulting in the Eldorans fighting the Dairugger Team while Dorn launches a Battle Machine to kill Zuno. When Dairugger and the Rugger Guard wipe out Dorn's fleet, a critically injured Zuno realizes Earth's true intent and reveals the location of Galveston's Frontline Base to Aki before she dies.

Leader of a technologically advanced humanoid tribe on Planet J in episode 37. Darl's tribe captures the Kurugger and interrogates Aki, learning that the Dairugger team is not a hostile threat like the Galveston Empire. The Aki Team discovers that the tribe previously lived on a planet with a red moon that the Rugger Guard recently explored. It is revealed that the tribe fled the planet and limited their use of technology after rendering the planet uninhabitable from years of nuclear testing. After Dairugger defeats a Battle Attacker launched by Emma's fleet, Darl forms an alliance with the Rugger Guard and pledges to support the fleet in their war against the Galveston Empire.

A boy that Walter Team encounters on Planet 71 in episode 40. When Denon falls off a waterfall while carrying a fawn, Izu and Nagato save them from drowning before they run away, leading Walter Team to the planet's inhabitants. Walter Team learns that the inhabitants are of the same race as Darl's tribe on Planet J. When Butler's fleet attacks the planet, Denon helplessly watches his fawn get killed by a Battle Attacker. Just as Dairugger is on the losing end of the battle, Denon's adult elk climbs up the Battle Attacker and rams its front monitor before falling to its death, allowing Dairugger to destroy the Battle Attacker.

Leader of the anti-government guerrilla faction on planet Galveston. He also acts as a spy, working as a palace servant.

Dairugger specifications
Weapons
 
 
 
 
 
 
 
 Beam Attacks

Episodes

Staff
 Planning  Susumu Yoshikawa  Yasuo Oyobe  Yu Saito
 Original concept  Saburo Hatte
 Chief Director  Kozo Morishita
 Series Composition  Keisuke Fujikawa
 Script  Keisuke Fujikawa  Shigemitsu Taguchi
 Character Design  Shigetaka Kiyoyama
 Mechanical Design  Katsushi Murakami  Takayuki Masuo  Yoshiroh Harada  Yutaka Izubuchi
 Music  Seiji Yokoyama
 Production  Toei  Toei Agency  TV Tokyo  Daiwon Animation  Toei Animation

Merchandise
In 1982, the original DX Dairugger XV toys were released by Popy Pleasure under the toy release number of GB-72, as part of the Chogokin label, and constructed of high-quality die-cast materials, with transforming gimmicks, which could separate only into the three larger combined vehicles. GB-73, a cheaper, ST (standard) version would follow, only Rugger #5 could separate from the robot. A larger version of Dairugger XV was also released, which did not contain die-cast materials, as the metal content was too heavy for the design and for the friction motors installed in many of the vehicles. The smallest non-transforming ST Dairugger and the fully transforming plastic Dairugger XV would be resold in the U.S. as part of the Voltron series by Matchbox in 1984, entirely under the Voltron name. However, the Matchbox version omitted the Dairugger Sword, Rugger units #6, #9, and #10's chrome antenna parts, and the sticker sheets of the Popy version. In addition to the toys above, Popy released a smaller, rubber-based combining Dairugger toy that was molded only in light blue. LJN released this toy in the Voltron series in 1985, with all of the parts remolded in roughly their proper colors and the sword in yellow.

Because Dairugger had 15 pieces, and was a highly playable figure compared to many of the other fixed-state super robots of the early 1980s, there were many imitations and bootlegs of Dairugger. Some were cheap plastics, did not assemble well, and had neon-glowing colors dissimilar to the show. Even approved brands such as Big Bear were spawned to rejuvenate the toyline. However, no version is identical in quality, packaging, or comes with all the pieces as does the Japanese original.

Toynami released a 24-inch soft vinyl Dairugger toy under their Shogun Warriors line in 2011.

In 2013, Miracle Productions released a new Dairugger toy as MA-01 "Voltron Vehicle Force". The initial release was limited to a few hundred units and was plagued with quality control issues and design flaws. A second version was released, with many of the parts redesigned and the build quality improved. This toy is considered an unofficial release, as Miracle Productions lost their license to produce the toy before its release.

A new Dairugger toy was released on October 26, 2019 as Soul of Chogokin No. GX-88 by Bandai Spirits. To promote the toy's release, Bandai uploaded the series on their YouTube channel. Like the SOC GoLion, Dairugger includes a weapons rack with the option to use either the Dairugger XV or Voltron nameplate.

Home media
The entire series, in 3 volumes, has been released on DVD in region 1. Collection 1 was released on February 23, 2010, Collection 2 on May 25, 2010, and Collection 3 on January 4, 2011. All three volumes are now out-of-print.

Changes for Voltron version
Note: for this section, names in parentheses are Voltron names

 Dairugger XV and GoLion are not related in any way, in contrast to the U.S. version (the coincidental similarities in design, most notably in the face, are due to having the same mechanical designer and a significant portion of the same animation staff).
 Scenes of Earth and Galaxy Garrison were edited into Lion Voltron episodes, but do not exist in GoLion (the Lion Voltron source material), only in Dairugger XV, since Earth in GoLion has been destroyed in a thermonuclear war.
 Many allied and enemy soldiers and commanding officers die in Dairugger, as opposed to disappearing without any explanation in the U.S. Voltron series (Voltron omitted almost all blood and death). The finale of Dairugger XV was different in its Voltron form — the U.S. footage had no depiction of Emperor Corsair's (Zeppo's) true fate, which left a lot of questions for U.S. viewers (although one shot of Corsair dead on the throne remained intact).  The scene of Emperor Corsair's death, perishing in an assassination attempt by Teles (Hazar) and the resistance, who want freedom for their people, was cut due to violence.
 In Voltron, Vehicle Voltron only has five minutes of stored nuclear/solar energy once combined and is thus used only as a last resort against the Drule Empire's Robeasts. This has resulted in numerous plot holes, as Vehicle Voltron is seen participating in lengthy space battles exceeding five minutes.
 In Dairugger, Teles (Hazar) dies a martyr, and there is a sad scene where his body is left to die on Galveston at his request. In Voltron, he becomes the new leader of his people.
 Sirk (Dorma) is Teles's adjutant, not his sister as in Voltron.
 Aki (Jeff) and Haruka (Lisa) have a closer relationship, which is not clearly shown in Voltron. The lucky charm that Haruka gives to Aki is left with Teles (Hazar) after his death on Galveston.
 Dick Asimov (Captain Newley) was Shinji Ise's (Commander Hawkins) superior officer in the original series. The dialogue was rewritten in Voltron to suggest that Hawkins was Newley's superior. There were inconsistencies, however that reveal the original ranks of the two officers.

Korean version
Super Titan 15 (슈퍼타이탄15) is a 1982 South Korean animated film that features a copy of Dairugger XV, as well as characters and vehicles derived from Galaxy Express 999.

Appearances in other media
The show was spoofed on an episode of Robot Chicken. Dairugger's Voltron incarnation is called to action by an outpost being attacked by a Robeast, but the vehicles take too long to combine (partly because they messed up halfway through). By the time Dairugger gets there, most of the crew is dead, and the sole survivor shoots himself when he realizes it's not the Lion Voltron.

References

External links
  
 Dairugger XV uncut scenes and comparison
 
 

1982 anime television series debuts
1982 Japanese television series debuts
1983 Japanese television series endings
Japanese children's animated action television series
Japanese children's animated space adventure television series
Japanese children's animated science fiction television series
Super robot anime and manga
TV Tokyo original programming
Voltron
Toei Animation television
Environmental television
Anti-war works
Extraterrestrials in anime and manga